V. gracilis may refer to:
 Vigna gracilis, a synonym for Vigna parkeri, a plant species in the genus Vigna
 Vucetichia gracilis, a synonym of Ferugliotherium windhauseni, a Cretaceous gondwanathere mammal

See also
 Gracilis (disambiguation)